This is the list of assets owned by PLDT. The following are wholly owned by PLDT unless otherwise indicated.

Wireless
Smart Communications
 Smart Broadband Inc.
 Primeworld Digital Systems, Inc.
 Wolfpac Mobile, Inc.
 Wireless Card Inc.
 Smart Money Holdings Corporation (SMHC) 
 Smart Money, Inc. (owned through SMHC) 
 Far East Capital Limited 
 Philippines Communications Holdings Corporation 
 Francom Holdings, Inc.
Connectivity Unlimited Resource Enterprise, Inc.
 Chikka Holdings Limited
Chikka Communications Consulting (Beijing) Co. Ltd.
Chikka Pte. Ltd.
 Smarthub Pte. Ltd.
 Takatack Pte. Ltd.
 3rd Brand Pte. Ltd. 
 Voyager Innovations, Inc.
 Telesat, Inc. 
ACeS Philippines Satellite Corporation 
 Mabuhay Investment Corporation

Fixed Line
 PLDT Clark Telecom, Inc.
 PLDT Subic Telecom, Inc.
 PLDT Global Corporation 
 PLDT HK Ltd.
 PLDT SG Pte. Ltd.
 PLDT Malaysia Sdn. Bhd.
 PLDT US
 PLDT UK Ltd.
 PLDT Italy S.r.l,
 PLDT-Philcom, Inc.
 ePLDT, Inc.
 IP Converge Data Services, Inc.
 Curo Teknika, Inc.
 ABM Global Solutions, Inc.
 ePDS, Inc.
 netGames, Inc.
 Digitel Telecommunications Philippines, Inc. (51.55%) 
 Digitel Mobile Philippines, Inc. (Sun Cellular) 
 Digitel Capital Philippines Ltd.
 Digitel Information Technology Services, Inc. 
 Asia Netcom Philippines Corporation (60%) 
 Digital Crossing, Inc. (40%) 
 PLDT-Maretel, Inc.
 Bonifacio Communications Corporation

Investments
 PLDT Global Investments Holdings, Inc.
 SPi Global Investments, Inc. (20%)
 Infocom Technologies, Inc. (20%)
 PLDT Global Investments Corporation 
 Rocket Internet AG (8.6%) 
 PLDT Communication and Energy Ventures
 Beacon Electric Asset Holdings, Inc (Meralco).
 Multisys Technologies Corporation (45.73%)
 Vega Telecom Inc. (50%)

Mass media
MediaQuest Holdings, Inc.
 TV5 Network, Inc.
 TV5
 One Sports
 Nation Broadcasting Corporation
 Radyo5 News FM
 Mediascape / Cignal TV, Inc.
 Cignal
 Cignal Play
 SatLite
 Colours
 Sari-Sari Channel 
 One Screen
 One PH 
 One News
 One Sports+
 PBA Rush 
 NBA TV Philippines 
 BuKo 
 UAAP Varsity Channel 
 Cignal Entertainment
 Unitel Group (30%)
 Unitel Productions
 Straight Shooters
 Hastings Holdings
 The Philippine Star (51%)
 BusinessWorld (70%)
 Pilipinas Global Network, Ltd.
 Kapatid TV5
 Aksyon TV International

References

External links
pldt.com.ph

PLDT
PLDT